Carol Arnauld (28 March 1961 – 9 September 2022) was a French singer and songwriter. She sang in the late 1980s and can be deemed as a one-hit wonder in France with her hit single "C'est pas facile...", released in September 1986. The song reached number 10 on the SNEP chart, stayed in the top 50 for 16 weeks and was certified Silver disc for 250,000 copies sold. Very moving, the song deals with her brother's death, killed by a reckless driver, and evokes her suffering and that of her mother. Arnauld published this song on her first album, self-titled Carol Arnauld, which contains songs about various situations of the life, such as infertility, divorce, and nostalgia for childhood. Her second and last album Temps denses was released in 1992 but didn't chart very well. Carol Arnauld died of cancer at the age of 61 on 9 September 2022.

Discography

Studio Albums
 1986 : Carol Arnauld Polydor, Céline Music
 1992 : Temps dense WMD

Singles
 1986 : "C'est pas facile..." – #10 in France, Silver disc
 1987 : "J'ai grandi trop vite"
 1987 : "Donne moi" (Avec Jacky Brown)
 1988 : "Toi qui voulais un enfant"
 1989 : "Musique black"
 1992 : "Si tu pars..."

Collaborations
 1988 : 75 Artistes pour le Liban (compilation)

References

External links
 Carol Arnauld, on Bide et Musique
 

1961 births
2022 deaths
20th-century French women singers
French women singer-songwriters
French women pop singers
Deaths from cancer in France